Joan Segarra Iracheta (15 November 1927 – 3 September 2008) was a Spanish footballer who played as a defender. He spent 16 seasons with FC Barcelona between 1950 and 1964, in which he played 299 matches in La Liga and served as the team's captain for multiple years. He is ranked fifth among all players, by number of starts, in the history of Barcelona.

After retirement, Segarra stayed on as a youth team coach, eventually becoming first team assistant coach to Helenio Herrera.

Honours
FC Barcelona
Inter-Cities Fairs Cup: 1955–58, 1958–60
Latin Cup: 1952
Small Club World Cup: 1957
Spanish League: 1951–52, 1952–53, 1958–59, 1959–60
Spanish Cup: 1950–51, 1951–52, 1952–53, 1956–57, 1958–59, 1962–63
Eva Duarte Cup: 1952, 1953

References

External links
 
 National team data 
 
 FC Barcelona web profile
 FC Barcelona profile
 FC Barcelona archives 
 

1927 births
2008 deaths
Footballers from Barcelona
Spanish footballers
Association football defenders
La Liga players
FC Barcelona players
Spain B international footballers
Spain international footballers
1962 FIFA World Cup players
Spanish football managers
UE Figueres managers
FC Barcelona Atlètic managers
Catalonia international footballers